P'iq'iñ Qullu (Aymara p'iq'iña head, qullu mountain, "head mountain", also spelled Peken Kkollu) is a mountain in the north of the Cordillera Real in the Andes of Bolivia, about  high. It is situated in the La Paz Department, Larecaja Province, Sorata Municipality. P'iq'iñ Qullu lies west of the Janq'u Uma-Illampu massif southeast of Sorata.

References 

Mountains of La Paz Department (Bolivia)